State Road 655 (SR 655) is a  state highway in Polk County, Florida, that runs from U.S. Route 17 and County Road 655 at Eloise just south of Winter Haven city limits to U.S. Route 92 in western Auburndale.

Major intersections

Related routes

County Road 655

County Road 655 (CR 655) is a  county road in Polk County, Florida, that is separated into two sections and are both former extensions of SR 655.

Major intersections

Southern segment

Northern segment

County Road 655A

County Road 655A (CR 655A) is a  county road in Polk County. It encircles Lake Garfield and provides access to the census designated place of Alturas. Both termini of the county road are at SR 60 and it runs in a horseshoe-shape. It was formerly SR 655A.

References

External links

FDOT Map of Polk County (Including SR 655 and CR 655)

655
655
Winter Haven, Florida
Auburndale, Florida